Julio Velázquez Santiago (born 5 October 1981) is a Spanish football manager, currently in charge of Eredivisie club Fortuna Sittard.

He began coaching at 15, and was the youngest ever Segunda División manager with Villarreal B at 30. He managed four other teams in that league.

Abroad, Velázquez spent several years in Portugal's Primeira Liga with Belenenses, Vitória de Setúbal and Marítimo. He also had a brief spell in the Italian Serie A, at Udinese.

Football career

Early years
Velázquez started training at the age of only 15, being in charge of youth teams in his hometown of Salamanca. His first job as a senior came in 2004, with AD Peña Respuela in the regional leagues.

Velázquez made his debut in the national leagues in 2010–11, being appointed at Polideportivo Ejido in the Segunda División B. He resigned in March, days after sporting director Enrique Burgos, and the Andalusians eventually finished 14th.

Villarreal
Velázquez then joined Villarreal CF's setup, first being in charge of the C side. On 24 December 2011, as José Francisco Molina left the reserves for the main squad, he was appointed his successor, thus becoming the youngest person ever to coach a club in the Segunda División, aged 30 years and two months.

On 13 June 2012, following the Yellow Submarine's top-flight relegation – which meant the B's also had to drop down a tier even though they finished in 12th position in division two – Velázquez was named first-team manager. On 13 January of the following year, following a 1–1 away draw against UD Almería, he was relieved of his duties.

Segunda División
In the following years, Velázquez continued to work in the second division, being relegated with Real Murcia even though the side finished in fourth position and qualified to the play-offs, and being sacked by Real Betis after only five months in charge. During roughly ten months and starting in December 2015, he was in charge of C.F. Os Belenenses in the Portuguese Primeira Liga.

Velázquez returned to his country and its second tier on 13 October 2016, signing with AD Alcorcón. He eventually managed to steer them out of the relegation zone and also ousted RCD Espanyol in the fourth round of the Copa del Rey, renewing his contract a two further years after the latter achievement.

Italy and Portugal
On 4 June 2018, after narrowly avoiding relegation, Velázquez left Alcorcón. From June–November of the same year he was in charge of Udinese Calcio of the Italian Serie A, being dismissed after only two league wins.

Velázquez returned to the Portuguese top flight in November 2019, being appointed at Vitória F.C. until the end of the season. He left by mutual consent the following 2 July, with the team three points above the relegation zone having not won any of the five games since the resumption of play following the COVID-19 break.

On 11 March 2021, Velázquez became C.S. Marítimo's third manager of the campaign at the last-placed side. His first match in charge was the following day, a 2–1 away win over C.D. Nacional in the Madeira derby.

Velázquez was relieved of his duties on 11 November 2021, with his team second-bottom after 11 rounds. He first reached his country's La Liga the following April, when he became Deportivo Alavés' third coach of the season after Javier Calleja and José Luis Mendilibar; one month later, after relegation as last, he left.

Fortuna Sittard
On 9 September 2022, Velázquez signed a one-year contract with Fortuna Sittard, bottom in the Dutch Eredivisie. He led them to their first victory of the campaign eight days later, 1–0 against Excelsior Rotterdam in spite of playing 15 minutes with one player less.

Managerial statistics

References

External links

1981 births
Living people
Sportspeople from Salamanca
Spanish football managers
La Liga managers
Segunda División managers
Segunda División B managers
Tercera División managers
Polideportivo Ejido managers
Villarreal CF B managers
Villarreal CF managers
Real Murcia managers
Real Betis managers
AD Alcorcón managers
Deportivo Alavés managers
Primeira Liga managers
C.F. Os Belenenses managers
Vitória F.C. managers
C.S. Marítimo managers
Serie A managers
Udinese Calcio managers
Eredivisie managers
Fortuna Sittard managers
Spanish expatriate football managers
Expatriate football managers in Portugal
Expatriate football managers in Italy
Expatriate football managers in the Netherlands
Spanish expatriate sportspeople in Portugal
Spanish expatriate sportspeople in Italy
Spanish expatriate sportspeople in the Netherlands